The Tahune AirWalk is a steel canopy walkway located in the Tahune Forest area 29 km from Geeveston and sits over the banks of the Huon River in the Huon Valley of southern Tasmania, Australia.

Location and features
The treetop walk overlooks the Huon and Picton Rivers joining in the far distance. The Tahune Airwalk site offers three walks onsite plus the Cable Eagle Hang Gliding.

Transport is provided to the start of the AirWalk for those with walking difficulties. The visitor centre has a fully licensed cafe and is open on a daily basis. Plus browse through the extensive range of exclusive souvenirs. The site has WIFI available at the visitor centre.

Ecology, Flora and Fauna
The airwalk is situated in a wet sclerophyll forest which contains many rainforest elements, including Myrtle Beech, Sassafrass, and Leatherwood trees. The broader region contains a mosaic of wet and dry sclerophyll forest types, as well as rainforest in undisturbed areas. Notable plant species include Eucalyptus Regnans and Eucalyptus Obliqua which may be seen as tall, dominant canopy trees.

Gallery

See also

Geeveston

References

External links
Tahune AirWalk

Tourist attractions in Tasmania
Southern Tasmania
Tasmanian forests
Pedestrian bridges in Australia